Kevin John Hickey (February 25, 1956 – May 16, 2012) was an American left-handed pitcher who spent six seasons in Major League Baseball (MLB) with the Chicago White Sox (1981–1983) and Baltimore Orioles (1989–1991). It was with the White Sox that he was a reliever with the American League (AL) West titlist in 1983 and a batting practice pitcher for the 2005 World Series Champions.

Hickey was born on February 25, 1956, in Chicago's South Side and was raised in the Brighton Park neighborhood. He first attended St. Rita of Cascia High School on a basketball scholarship, but was expelled for excessive truancy. He completed his secondary education at Thomas Kelly High School.

In August 1978, Hickey attended an open tryout held by the White Sox at Chicago's McKinley Park. Hickey was recruited after a staffer saw him playing 16" softball for the Bobcats at Kelly Park. He was the only player out of 250 to receive a contract, signing a minor league deal for $500 a month.

Hickey was one of several former major league players to appear in the baseball film Major League II, which was released in 1994. In it, he played the role of "Schoup".

After Hickey's retirement as a player, he worked as a car salesman in Columbus, Ohio, for almost ten years. He then moved back to Chicago and in 2003, the White Sox hired him to be their batting practice pitcher. He continued to work in that capacity for the rest of his life. On April 5, 2012, he was found unresponsive in his hotel room in Arlington, Texas, where the White Sox opened their 2012 season against the Texas Rangers. Hickey died on May 16, 2012, at Rush University Medical Center in Chicago. He was 56.

References

Sources

 Source: Ex-Sox pitcher Hickey in coma - Chicago White Sox Blog - ESPN

1956 births
2012 deaths
Major League Baseball pitchers
Chicago White Sox players
Baltimore Orioles players
Reading Phillies players
Hawaii Islanders players
Appleton Foxes players
Glens Falls White Sox players
Columbus Clippers players
Denver Zephyrs players
Albany-Colonie Yankees players
Portland Beavers players
Rochester Red Wings players
Phoenix Firebirds players
Hagerstown Suns players
Charlotte Knights players
Baseball players from Chicago